SmartDeviceLink consists of two distinct software elements: a core automotive piece which wraps in-vehicle services and integrates to the in-vehicle HMI, and a mobile proxy, which executes APIs to access and use services on the automotive head unit.

It is a project intended to standardize and wrap the many in-vehicle interfaces which may exist in the automotive context. The end goal is to provide an expandable software framework to both mobile application developers and automotive head unit creators for the creation of brought-in applications that appear integrated onto a head unit.

Features

In-vehicle core 
The in-vehicle core has some of the following features:
 Manages the physical discovery and logical transport connection to a mobile device application
 Can support white-labeled, multi-function but single application use cases, as well as single app, single function use cases
 Provides a consistent interface for applications to understand the capabilities of an in-vehicle head unit
 Manages and maintains the state of connected mobile applications and notifies applications of appropriate state changes
 Wraps in-vehicle services such as buttons, displays, voice, menu systems, audio controls and other common vehicle inputs and outputs to a common messaging format and API
 Is expandable to allow for specific OEM or head unit manufacturer APIs or messaging
 Creates a template- and meta-based UI that creates consistent developer experiences regardless of the actual HMI representation

Mobile proxy components 
The mobile proxy components support some of the following:
 Provides a common, abstracted interface to the in-car entertainment system to integrate to SmartDeviceLink-enabled mobile applications
 Is available for Android and iPhone applications
 Supports TCP, Bluetooth and Apple-specific protocol implementations for transport, and can be expanded to include other transports
 Simplifies transport discovery, connection, and protocol use
 Is expandable to allow for specific-OEM or head unit manufacturer APIs or messaging

Operation 
 Smart device and car connect via standard protocols such as  Bluetooth and Wi-Fi.
 Application makes requests to the vehicle and the vehicle responds (Remote Procedure Calls). Application appears to be running inside the vehicle, but all business logic is contained on mobile device.
 User interacts with the vehicle, and it notifies application of any system or user events
 Application reacts by sending requests to modify application behavior or appearance in the vehicle.

References 

Tim Stevens: Ford races to create standard for connected cars, CNET, 26 November 2013

External links 
 GENIVI Alliance, now called COVESA (Connected Vehicle Systems Alliance): SmartDeviceLink
 

Application programming interfaces
Automotive software